Maria-Ivanna Hrushevska (née: Wojakiwska; 8 November 1868 – 19 September 1948) was a spouse of Ukrainian political leader Mykhailo Hrushevsky.

Maria-Ivanna Hrushevska, was born near Zboriv (Austria-Hungary) to Sylvester and Karolina Wojakowski. She met Hrushevsky in Lviv in 1893 and after three years they married in the town of Skala near Borschiv. On 21 June 1900, while living in Lviv, a daughter was born in the family of Hrushevsky – Kateryna.

Since 1917 Maria was a member of the Central Rada and a treasurer for the Ukrainian National Theater. She translated works of Russian and French writers.

From 1919 she was with her family in exile in Prague, Paris, Geneva. From autumn 1920 she and her husband and daughter lived in Vienna. In the spring of 1924 they returned to the Ukrainian SSR and settled in Kyiv in a house on Pankovskaya street 9.

Katerina's daughter was arrested on 10 July 1938, and was later sentenced for "supporting the anti-Soviet activity of the Ukrainian nationalist organization in order to establish a fascist dictatorship." Mary wrote letters asking for a case to Stalin to be reviewed, but in vain. Katerina died on 30 March 1943 in the Temlag.

References

1868 births
1948 deaths
People from Ternopil Oblast
People from the Kingdom of Galicia and Lodomeria
Ukrainian Austro-Hungarians
First Ladies of Ukraine
Members of the Central Council of Ukraine
Ukrainian translators
20th-century Ukrainian women politicians